Carolyn W. Colvin (born May 27, 1942 in Arnold, Maryland) was the Acting Commissioner of Social Security Administration in the United States, appointed on February 14, 2013, having succeeded Michael J. Astrue.  On June 20, 2014, President Barack Obama nominated her to serve as the commissioner. On September 18, 2014, the United States Senate Committee on Finance approved her nomination by a 22–2 vote. However, her nomination was never brought up for a vote before the full Senate.

Previously, she was the Deputy Commissioner, having been nominated by Obama and confirmed by the United States Senate in 2010. She had previously worked at the Social Security Administration during the 1990s.

Colvin is a graduate of Morgan State University with a BS in Business Administration and an MBA. She has one son and six grandchildren.

Career 

 Secretary of the Maryland Department of Human Resources (1989–1994)
 Deputy Commissioner for Policy and External Affairs, Social Security Administration (1994–1996)
 Deputy Commissioner for Programs and Policy, Social Security Administration (1996–1998)
 Deputy Commissioner for Operations, Social Security Administration (1998–2001)
 Director of the District of Columbia Department of Human Services (2001–2003)
 Director of the Montgomery County Department of Health and Human Services (2003–2007)
 chief executive officer of AMERIGROUP Community Care of the District of Columbia (2007–2008)
 Special Assistant to the Secretary of Maryland Department of Transportation (2009–2011)

In November 2020, Colvin was named a member of the Joe Biden presidential transition Agency Review Team to support transition efforts related to the Social Security Administration.

Colvin is a Fellow of the National Academy of Public Administration.

References

External links
 The Acting Commissioner of Social Security
 Carolyn W. Colvin-Former Secretaries-Department of Human Resources-Maryland Manual On-Line

1942 births
21st-century American women politicians
21st-century American politicians
African-American women in politics
Commissioners of the Social Security Administration
Living people
Maryland Democrats
Morgan State University alumni
Obama administration personnel
People from Arnold, Maryland
State cabinet secretaries of Maryland
African-American state cabinet secretaries
United States Department of Health and Human Services officials